Javier Pascual Rodríguez (born 14 November 1971) is a Spanish former cyclist.

Major results

1998
 1st Stage 5 Vuelta a Colombia
1999
 1st  Overall Vuelta a Andalucía
 2nd Overall Vuelta a Murcia
1st Stage 2
 3rd Overall Vuelta a la Comunidad Valenciana
2000
 2nd Overall Setmana Catalana de Ciclisme
 5th Overall Paris–Nice
2001
 1st Stage 3 Vuelta a Castilla y León
2002
 3rd Overall Vuelta a Andalucía
1st Stage 4
 5th Klasika Primavera
 5th Overall Vuelta a la Comunidad Valenciana
 10th Trofeo Luis Puig
2003
 6th Züri-Metzgete
 7th Liège–Bastogne–Liège
 10th Overall Vuelta a Andalucía
2004
 1st Stage 18 Vuelta a España
 3rd Circuito de Getxo
 10th Overall Vuelta a Murcia
2005
 1st  Overall Vuelta a La Rioja
1st Stage 1
 1st GP Miguel Indurain
 3rd Gran Premio de Llodio
 4th GP Villafranca de Ordizia

Grand Tour general classification results timeline

References

External links

1971 births
Living people
Spanish male cyclists
Spanish Vuelta a España stage winners
Sportspeople from the Province of León
Cyclists from Castile and León